Schiavetti is an Italian surname. Notable people with the surname include:

Enrico Schiavetti (1920–1993), Italian footballer
Igor Schiavetti (born 1976), Italian baseball player

Italian-language surnames